Ronald Ray Bruner Jr. (born October 5, 1982) is an American jazz drummer, composer and producer. He has played with hardcore punk/crossover thrash band Suicidal Tendencies. Bruner was part of the band that received a Grammy Award for Best Contemporary Jazz Album in 2010 for The Stanley Clarke Band.

He is the brother of musician Stephen Lee Bruner, who is better known by his stage name Thundercat. He frequently performs alongside Thundercat, Kamasi Washington, and Terrace Martin as a member of the Los Angeles jazz collective West Coast Get Down. In 2015, he appeared with the collective on Washington's major-label debut album, The Epic.

Discography

As leader
Triumph (World Galaxy, 2017)

As sideman
Stanley Clarke
Thunder, as S.M.V., with Marcus Miller and Victor Wooten (2008)
The Stanley Clarke Band (2010)
Up (2014)

George Duke
Déjà Vu (2010)
Brazilian Fusion (2013)

Flying Lotus
You're Dead! (Warp, 2014)
Flamagra (2019)

Kenny Garrett
Seeds from the Underground (Mack Avenue, 2012)
Do Your Dance! (2016)
Sounds From the Ancestors (Mack Avenue, 2021)

Cameron Graves
Planetary Prince (Mack Avenue, 2017)

Kendrick Lamar
To Pimp a Butterfly (Top Dawg, 2015)

Terrace Martin
Velvet Portraits (Sounds of Crenshaw, 2016)

Suicidal Tendencies
13 (Suicidal, 2013)

Kamasi Washington
The Epic (Brainfeeder, 2015)
Harmony of Difference (Young Turks, 2017)
Heaven and Earth (Young Turks, 2018)

References 

American heavy metal drummers
African-American drummers
African-American rock musicians
Living people
Suicidal Tendencies members
1982 births